Lawal Suleiman Bilbis (born 1961) is an educator and lecturer in the department of Biochemistry at the Usmanu Danfodiyo University appointed as the Vice chancellor of the University in July 2019, replaced Abdullahi Zuru. He previously served as the deputy chancellor academics at Usmanu Danfodiyo University and had served as the pioneer vice chancellor of the Federal University, Birnin Kebbi in 2013.

He is an indigene of Tsafe, at Magazu Village in Zamfara State, Nigeria.

Education 
He holds a B.Sc. of Biochemistry from the Usmanu Danfodiyo University, Sokoto in 1986 and PhD of Biological Chemistry from the University of Essex, England in 1992.

He became a Professor of Biochemistry in 2002 at the Usmanu Danfodiyo University.

Career 
He started working as a clinical Biochemistry at the General Hospital, Gusau before joining academics.

Academic career

He began as an assistant lecturer in 1988 at the Usmanu Danfodiyo University and had serve as Head of Department of Biochemistry, dean in the Science Faculty. He was also deputy chancellor academics and the Director University Development Office in UDUS.

Publications 

 Studies of prokallikreins from sheep pancreas and kidney. Ph. D. University of Essex, 1992, Academic theses. Book, Archival Material, 
 Antioxidants in the service of man, Series Title: Inaugural lecture (Usmanu Danfodiyo University), 16th. Series: Inaugural lecture (Usmanu Danfodiyo University), 16th. Book, Lawal Suleman Bilbis. 16, Central Coordinating Committee for University Inaugural Lecturers and Seminars, Sixteenth inaugural lecture, 2015,

References 

Living people
1961 births
Usmanu Danfodiyo University alumni
Nigerian biochemists

External links 

 
 

Nigerian educators
Alumni of the University of Essex